Etmadpur is a town (tehsil) in Agra district  in the state of Uttar Pradesh, India. It is located eastward 19 km from Agra. It is 274 km far from state capital Lucknow.

Demographics
As of 2011 Indian Census, Etmadpur had a total population of 21,897, of which 11,591 were males and 10,306 were females. Population within the age group of 0 to 6 years was 3,069. The total number of literates in Etmadpur was 14,161, which constituted 64.7% of the population with male literacy of 70.6% and female literacy of 58.0%. The effective literacy rate of 7+ population of Etmadpur was 75.2%, of which male literacy rate was 82.2% and female literacy rate was 67.4%. The Scheduled Castes and Scheduled Tribes population was 4,547 and 2 respectively. Etmadpur had 3577 households in 2011.

 India census, Etmadpur had a population of 19,412. Males constitute 53% of the population and females 47%. Etmadpur has an average literacy rate of 55%, lower than the national average of 59.5%: male literacy is 63%, and female literacy is 45%. In Etmadpur, 17% of the population is under 6 years of age.

About the town
It is a small town located on national highway 2 connecting Delhi to Kolkata. The town is believed to be named after Mirza Ghiyas Beg the I'timād-ud-Daulah, a Mughal official, father of Nur Jahan and grandfather of Mumtaz Mahal.

Dharm palSingh of the Bhartiya Janta Party won the 2022 state assembly elections to become the MLA from Etmadpur.

References

Cities and towns in Agra district